Bruno Augusto Pelissari de Lima (born 3 January 1993), popularly known as Bruno Pelissari, is a Brazilian professional footballer. He has previously played for Atlético Paranaense, in the Indian Super League with Chennaiyin and Delhi Dynamos, and for Sheriff Tiraspol in Moldova.

Career

Club career

Chennaiyin
Pelissari was loaned to Indian Super League club Chennaiyin FC for the 2014 season, where he scored 4 goals in 11 appearances. He was very instrumental in 2014 season. Pelissari re-joined Chennaiyin Fc on loan for the 2015 Indian Super League season. He played a very crucial part for Chennaiyin Fc in 2015 Indian Super League season, he scored in the final and helped Chennaiyin FC to win the 2015 Indian Super League season.

Sheriff Tiraspol
On 1 March 2016, Pelissari signed for Moldovan Divizia Națională side Sheriff Tiraspol. he only managed to play three games for Divizia Națională side Sheriff Tiraspol. He was released for the contract after the end of the season.

Delhi Dynamos
On 1 August 2016,  Bruno Pellisari was unveiled as a new player of Delhi Dynamos. He was the second signing of the season.

Votuporanguense
In October 2017, he joined Brazilian club Votuporanguense.

Gokulam Kerala

In July 2019, he returned for his third stint in India, this time with I-League club Gokulam Kerala FC.

Career statistics

Honors

Club

Chennaiyin FC
 Indian Super League: 2015 - Champions

Gokulam Kerala F.C.

Durand Cup : 2019

References

External links 
 
 ISL profile

1993 births
Living people
People from Umuarama
Sportspeople from Paraná (state)
Brazilian footballers
Association football midfielders
Campeonato Brasileiro Série A players
Indian Super League players
Moldovan Super Liga players
Club Athletico Paranaense players
Chennaiyin FC players
FC Sheriff Tiraspol players
Odisha FC players
Clube Atlético Votuporanguense players
Brazilian expatriate footballers
Brazilian expatriate sportspeople in India
Expatriate footballers in India
Expatriate footballers in Moldova
Brazilian expatriate sportspeople in Moldova